Bedaf (also Romanized as Bedāf, Badāf, and Bodāf; also known as  Bīdu) is a village in Mehrabad Rural District of Bahman District of Abarkuh County, Yazd province, Iran. At the 2006 National Census, its population was 978 in 266 households. The following census in 2011 counted 1,051 people in 313 households. The latest census in 2016 showed a population of 1,111 people in 313 households; it was the largest village in its rural district.

References 

Abarkuh County

Populated places in Yazd Province

Populated places in Abarkuh County